Moscow City Duma District 29 is one of 45 constituencies in Moscow City Duma. The constituency covers parts of Southern Moscow since 2014. In 1993-2005 District 29 was based in Western Moscow, however, after the number of constituencies was reduced to 15 in 2005, the constituency was eliminated.

Members elected

Election results

2001

|-
! colspan=2 style="background-color:#E9E9E9;text-align:left;vertical-align:top;" |Candidate
! style="background-color:#E9E9E9;text-align:left;vertical-align:top;" |Party
! style="background-color:#E9E9E9;text-align:right;" |Votes
! style="background-color:#E9E9E9;text-align:right;" |%
|-
|style="background-color:#1042A5"|
|align=left|Vladimir Platonov (incumbent)
|align=left|Union of Right Forces
|
|59.53%
|-
|style="background-color:"|
|align=left|Viktor Anpilov
|align=left|Independent
|
|20.22%
|-
|style="background-color:"|
|align=left|Andrey Priyatkin
|align=left|Independent
|
|2.42%
|-
|style="background-color:#000000"|
|colspan=2 |against all
|
|14.71%
|-
| colspan="5" style="background-color:#E9E9E9;"|
|- style="font-weight:bold"
| colspan="3" style="text-align:left;" | Total
| 
| 100%
|-
| colspan="5" style="background-color:#E9E9E9;"|
|- style="font-weight:bold"
| colspan="4" |Source:
|
|}

2014

|-
! colspan=2 style="background-color:#E9E9E9;text-align:left;vertical-align:top;" |Candidate
! style="background-color:#E9E9E9;text-align:left;vertical-align:top;" |Party
! style="background-color:#E9E9E9;text-align:right;" |Votes
! style="background-color:#E9E9E9;text-align:right;" |%
|-
|style="background-color:"|
|align=left|Nina Minko
|align=left|Independent
|
|36.18%
|-
|style="background-color:"|
|align=left|Aleksandr Medvedev
|align=left|Communist Party
|
|24.05%
|-
|style="background-color:"|
|align=left|Ivan Petrov
|align=left|Liberal Democratic Party
|
|15.99%
|-
|style="background-color:"|
|align=left|Gennady Gendin
|align=left|A Just Russia
|
|13.41%
|-
|style="background-color:"|
|align=left|Yury Porokhovnichenko
|align=left|Yabloko
|
|4.33%
|-
|style="background-color:"|
|align=left|Viktor Sonkin
|align=left|Independent
|
|2.70%
|-
| colspan="5" style="background-color:#E9E9E9;"|
|- style="font-weight:bold"
| colspan="3" style="text-align:left;" | Total
| 
| 100%
|-
| colspan="5" style="background-color:#E9E9E9;"|
|- style="font-weight:bold"
| colspan="4" |Source:
|
|}

2019

|-
! colspan=2 style="background-color:#E9E9E9;text-align:left;vertical-align:top;" |Candidate
! style="background-color:#E9E9E9;text-align:left;vertical-align:top;" |Party
! style="background-color:#E9E9E9;text-align:right;" |Votes
! style="background-color:#E9E9E9;text-align:right;" |%
|-
|style="background-color:"|
|align=left|Oleg Artemyev
|align=left|Independent
|
|41.52%
|-
|style="background-color:"|
|align=left|Nikolay Sergeyev
|align=left|Communist Party
|
|33.36%
|-
|style="background-color:"|
|align=left|Boris Chernyshov
|align=left|Liberal Democratic Party
|
|12.61%
|-
|style="background-color:"|
|align=left|Sergey Zhuravsky
|align=left|A Just Russia
|
|8.39%
|-
| colspan="5" style="background-color:#E9E9E9;"|
|- style="font-weight:bold"
| colspan="3" style="text-align:left;" | Total
| 
| 100%
|-
| colspan="5" style="background-color:#E9E9E9;"|
|- style="font-weight:bold"
| colspan="4" |Source:
|
|}

References

Moscow City Duma districts